Emerald Lake is a small proglacial lake near the summit of Mount Timpanogos in the middle of the Mount Timpanogos Wilderness in the Wasatch Range in northeastern Utah County, Utah, United States.

Description

The now mostly vanished and completely buried Timpanogos Glacier left behind a terminal moraine which now impounds the lake. The runoff from the rock glacier feeds the lake and colors it blue. The lake is accessible by hiking, the Mount Timpanogos Trail (also known as the Aspen Grove Trail) from Aspen Grove being the fastest way to reach it.

During summer weekends the Timpanogos Emergency Response Team (TERT) stations volunteers at a camp near Emerald Lake to assist with emergency incidents that frequently occur on the mountain.

According to some versions of The Legend of Timpanogos, Emerald Lake is the immortalization of Red Eagle, after he fell to his death from the peak of Mount Timpanogos.

See also
 List of lakes in Utah

References

External links

Lakes of Utah
Lakes of Utah County, Utah
Tourist attractions in Utah County, Utah
Wasatch Range
Proglacial lakes